Paul O'Connor is an Irish Gaelic footballer with the Kenmare GAA club and Kerry county team.

Playing career
Paul O'Connor was Kerry's forward in the 2004 and 2005 All-Ireland Minor Football Championship, scoring 6 points in the 2004 final which Kerry lost to Tyrone. The following year, he was selected for the senior panel. The 19-year-old was a shock selection at left corner-forward for Kerry in the Munster Senior Football Championship final against Cork. It was his first All-Ireland Senior Football Championship start. The Cork side won, and O'Connor never really got into the game.  He remained in the panel up to 2010, but only as a peripheral forward. However, he won the 2008 All-Ireland Under-21 Football Championship with Kerry. He plays football and hurling with Kenmare.

References

Year of birth missing (living people)
Living people
Dual players
Kenmare Gaelic footballers
Kenmare hurlers
Kerry inter-county Gaelic footballers